Oil drum may refer to:
 Drum (container), a cylindrical container used for transporting bulk goods such as oil and fuel
 The Oil Drum, an energy discussion website